Marley is a hamlet in the civil parish of Harrietsham that, in turn, forms part of the district of Maidstone in the English county of Kent.

External links 

Villages in Kent